Teresa (Terry) Jordan is a sedimentary geologist known for her research on the geology and hydrology of the Atacama Desert and the use of water and geothermal heat from sedimentary rocks.

Education and career 
Jordan has a B.S. from Rensselaer Polytechnic Institute (1974) and earned a Ph.D. from Stanford University (1979). Following her Ph.D. she moved to Cornell University initially in a research position, and then she joined the faculty in 1984 where she was named the J. Preston Levis Professor of Engineering in 2005.

In 2014, Jordan was named a fellow of the American Geophysical Union, and the citation was "for integration of geodynamic principles and stratigraphic data that has led to understanding of the coupling of continental basins to mountain belts."

Research 

Jordan's research spans geology and engineering. In Chile, she works on the climate and hydrology of the Atacama Desert, with a particular focus on the impact of large rainfall events on the region. She also examines the tectonic history of the Central Andes Plateau. More locally, Cornell University is working to use geothermal heat as an energy source, and Jordan is co-investigator on the effort to drill a research borehole to inform the project about the region's geologic conditions.

Selected publications

Awards and honors 
Fellow, Geological Society of America
Corresponding Member, Asociación Geológica Argentina (1997)
Lawrence Sloss award, Geological Society of America (2005)
Fellow, American Geophysical Union (2014)
William H. Twenhofel Medal, Society for Sedimentary Geology (2021)

References

External links 
 

Fellows of the Geological Society of America
Fellows of the American Geophysical Union
Rensselaer Polytechnic Institute alumni
Stanford University alumni
Cornell University faculty
Living people
American women geologists
People from Dunkirk, New York
1953 births
21st-century American women